The Avero House is a historic house located at 41 St. George Street in St. Augustine, Florida, United States. The building is locally significant as one of 30 remaining houses within the historic district that pre-date 1821. It was once the site of a Minorcan Chapel. Today, the building is home to the St. Photios Greek Orthodox National Shrine.

Description and history 
The Avero House is a two-story rectangular block with an open loggia on the southeastern portion of the lot. The walls are made of coquina stone laid in roughly horizontal courses with lime mortar, which are plastered both inside and outside. At the flat roof, there are several copper scuppers.

Although the house was apparently built around 1749, the first detailed information on its layout does not appear until a map from 1763, which depicts it as having a U-shaped floor plan.

The Greek Orthodox Archdiocese of North and South America purchased the building in 1966 and restored the house to its 1730s appearance. Today the house is open to the public as the St. Photios Greek Orthodox National Shrine, dedicated to the first colony of Greek people who came to America in 1768. The Shrine includes the St. Photios Chapel which features Byzantine iconography, the relics of 18 saints of the Early Church, and a museum with a permanent exhibit about the life of early Greek settlers as well as temporary exhibits that are changed out annually.

The Avero House was added to the U.S. National Register of Historic Places on June 13, 1972.

Gallery

References

External links

 Saint Photios Greek Orthodox National Shrine - official site
 St. Johns County listings at National Register of Historic Places
 Florida's Office of Cultural and Historical Programs
 St. Johns County listings at Florida's Office of Cultural and Historical Programs
 St. Photios Greek Shrine

Greek-American culture in Florida
Houses on the National Register of Historic Places in Florida
National Register of Historic Places in St. Johns County, Florida
Museums in St. Augustine, Florida
History museums in Florida
Religious museums in Florida
Houses in St. Johns County, Florida
1749 establishments in the Spanish Empire
Houses completed in 1749
Christian shrines